The Bahamas competed at the 2012 Summer Olympics in London, United Kingdom from 27 July to 12 August 2012. The Bahamas Olympic Association sent a total of 24 athletes to these Games, 14 men and 10 women, to compete only in athletics and swimming. The nation's participation at the Olympic games marked its sixteenth appearance as an independent nation.

The Bahamas' only medal was won in athletics. On 10 August, Chris Brown, Michael Mathieu, Ramon Miller, and Demetrius Pinder ended their Olympic journey for the national team by winning the gold medal in the men's 4 × 400 metres relay. Brown, silver medalist in the relay event in Beijing, became the nation's first male flag bearer at the opening ceremony since 1996.

Medalists

Athletics

Athletes from the Bahamas achieved qualifying standards in the following athletics events (up to a maximum of 3 athletes in each event at the 'A' Standard, and 1 at the 'B' Standard):

Key
Note–Ranks given for track events are within the athlete's heat only
Q = Qualified for the next round
q = Qualified for the next round as a fastest loser or, in field events, by position without achieving the qualifying target
NR = National record
N/A = Round not applicable for the event
Bye = Athlete not required to compete in round

Men
Track & road events

Field events

Women
Track & road events

Field events

Swimming

Swimmers from the Bahamas achieved qualifying standards in the following events (up to a maximum of 2 swimmers in each event at the Olympic Qualifying Time, and potentially 1 at the Olympic Selection Time):

Women

See also
Bahamas at the 2011 Pan American Games

References

External links

Nations at the 2012 Summer Olympics
2012
Olympics